Vladimir Tanurcov (born 27 November 1977) is a Moldovan footballer currently playing for FC Zimbru Chișinău.

References

External links
 

Living people
1977 births
Moldovan footballers
Moldova international footballers
Moldovan expatriate footballers
FC Sheriff Tiraspol players
FC Zimbru Chișinău players
Expatriate footballers in Ukraine
Association football midfielders